Essex county cricket teams have been traced back to the 18th century but the county's involvement in cricket goes back much further than that.  It is almost certain that cricket reached Essex by the 16th century and that it developed during the 17th century with inter-parish matches being played.

18th century
The first definite mention of cricket in connection with the county is a highly controversial match in 1724 between Chingford and Edwin Stead's XI, which is recorded in The Dawn of Cricket by H. T. Waghorn. The venue is unknown but, if it were at Chingford, it is also the earliest reference to cricket being played in Essex as well as by an Essex team. The game echoed an earlier one in 1718 as the Chingford team refused to play to a finish when Stead's team had the advantage. A court case followed and, as in 1718, it was ordered to be played out presumably so that all wagers could be fulfilled. Lord Chief Justice Pratt presided over the case and he ordered them to play it out on Dartford Brent, though it is not known if this was the original venue. The game was completed in 1726.

The earliest reference to a team called Essex is in July 1732 when a combined Essex & Herts team played against the London Cricket Club. In July 1737, there was London v Essex at the Artillery Ground, London winning by 45 runs. In a return game at Ilford on 1 August 1737, Essex won by 7 runs.

References are then occasional until 1785 when the Hornchurch Cricket Club, based at Langton Park, became prominent. This club had a very strong team that was representative of Essex as a county. However, the sources differed among themselves re whether the team should be called Essex or Hornchurch. But there is no doubt that Essex held important match status from 1785 until 1794, after which the county strangely and abruptly disappeared from the records for a long time.

19th century
Little was heard of Essex cricket from 1794 until the formation of Essex County Cricket Club on 14 January 1876 at a meeting in the Shire Hall, Brentwood.<ref>Wisden Cricketers' Almanack 1877</ref> The new club did not achieve first-class status until 1894. The team played its inaugural first-class match on 14, 15 & 16 May 1894 against Leicestershire County Cricket Club (who were also making their first-class debut) at Leyton. In 1895, both of these clubs and Warwickshire County Cricket Club joined the County Championship.

References

Bibliography
 Derek Birley, A Social History of English Cricket, Aurum, 1999
 Rowland Bowen, Cricket: A History of its Growth and Development, Eyre & Spottiswoode, 1970
 G. B. Buckley, Fresh Light on 18th Century Cricket, Cotterell, 1935
 Arthur Haygarth, Scores & Biographies, Volume 1 (1744-1826), Lillywhite, 1862
 H. T. Waghorn, Cricket Scores, Notes, etc. (1730-1773), Blackwood, 1899
 H. T. Waghorn, The Dawn of Cricket'', Electric Press, 1906

External links
 The development of Cricket in Eastern Essex

History of Essex
English cricket teams in the 18th century
Former senior cricket clubs
Essex County Cricket Club
County cricket